1985 ACC tournament may refer to:

 1985 ACC men's basketball tournament
 1985 ACC women's basketball tournament
 1985 Atlantic Coast Conference baseball tournament